In Arcadia is a 2002 novel by Ben Okri. It is a book inspired by the painting Et in Arcadia ego, and sweeps through 400 years of history, set in Europe, primarily London and Paris.

References

2002 British novels
Weidenfeld & Nicolson books
British historical novels
Novels set in London
Novels set in Paris
Novels by Ben Okri
2002 Nigerian novels